Lindsay Davenport was the defending champion, but was forced to retire in the final due to a right shoulder strain.

Justine Henin-Hardenne won the title, leading in the final 6–0, 1–0 until Davenport retired. It was the 5th title of the year for Henin-Hardenne and the 28th of her career.

Seeds
The first four seeds received a bye into the second round.

Draw

Finals

Top half

Bottom half

External links
 WTA tournament draws

Pilot Pen Tennis
2006 Pilot Pen Tennis